Bruno Thiry  (born 8 October 1962) is a Belgian rally driver. He was born in St. Vith, Liège Province.

He began his career as an amateur in 1981, driving a Simca, and quickly became very successful in the Belgian Rally Championship. by 1991 to 1993, he joined the GME team that contested only in some selected World Rally Championship (WRC) events and in non-WRC events. In 1992, he managed a first podium finish for him on the final running of the notorious Rallye Côte d'Ivoire and finished second in an ex-works Opel Kadett GSI. The following year saw Thiry win some WRC events in an Opel Astra in the F2 category and brought GME its first manufacturer's title of the inaugural FIA 2-Litre World Cup in 1993. 1994, the year saw Thiry join the Ford team to contest the WRC, driving a Ford Escort RS Cosworth. In these years, he managed several third places; in the RAC Rally in 1994 and in Rally San Remo and the Rally Catalunya in 1996. He finished fifth overall in the WRC standings in 1994.

In 1997, he won the Rally of the Azores in a privately entered Escort Cosworth. The following year saw Thiry continue with Ford and he contested thirteen events with the exception of the Safari Rally and Rally Portugal due to an accident that caused Thiry two broken ribs and he was replaced by Ari Vatanen as the second driver for the team. Then in 1999 he campaigned a Subaru Impreza in his role as third driver for the Subaru World Rally Team.

2001 saw Thiry joined the Škoda Motorsport team and he had a disappointing year in the Octavia WRC. His highest placings that year were eight place in the Monte Carlo Rally, the Cyprus Rally and Rally Great Britain.

In 2002 and 2003, the Peugeot 206 WRC was Thiry's vehicle of choice. He won the Ypres Rally both years, and became European Champion in 2003 after five victories. In 2004, he was runner-up in a Citroën C2 S1600.

Since 2005, Thiry has more or less retired from motorsport and only occasionally competes on events. A notable recent result was a second place on the Rally of Condroz in 2006, driving a Peugeot 307 WRC. His co-driver for most of his rallying career was fellow-Belgian Stéphane Prévot.

WRC results

External links

Stats at RallyBase
Stats at World Rally Archive

1962 births
Living people
People from St. Vith
World Rally Championship drivers
European Rally Championship drivers
Belgian rally drivers
Sportspeople from Liège Province
Škoda Motorsport drivers